Pyotr Pavlovich Filippov (September 21, 1893 in Saint Petersburg – 9 October 1965 in Leningrad) was a Russian Soviet football player and coach.

Honours
 RSFSR Champion: 1924.

International career
Filippov made his debut for USSR on November 16, 1924 in a friendly against Turkey.

External links
  Profile

1893 births
Footballers from Saint Petersburg
1965 deaths
Russian footballers
Russian expatriate footballers
Expatriate footballers in England
Soviet footballers
Soviet Union international footballers
Soviet football managers
FC Zenit Saint Petersburg managers
FC Dinamo Batumi managers
Association football midfielders
Honoured Masters of Sport of the USSR